The Vice Chairperson of the Barbuda Council is the deputy leader of the Barbudan Government. Established by the Barbuda Local Government Act of 1976, its first election was on March 22nd, 1979.

Role in the Council Meetings 
The vice chairperson will take the role of chairperson in the event of the chairperson being absent from a session.

References 

Barbuda Council
Heads of local government